Szczawnica is a resort town in Nowy Targ County in Lesser Poland Voivodeship, in southern Poland. As of June 30, 2007, its population was 7,378.

Szczawnica has been a well-known resort town since the mid nineteenth century. Due to the presence of alkali sorrel springs and favorable climatic conditions, many respiratory and digestive tract illnesses are treated there. In 2005 the popular local spa was officially returned by the Polish government to its prewar owners – Count Stadnicki family. The spa has almost two-hundred-year history. Its last private owner was Count Adam Stadnicki, whose grandson – Andrzej Mańkowski – is the founder of the new Spa Town Museum being fitted in the center of Szczawnica, at Dietl Square (2009). The museum of the Szczawnica resort aims to present more than 350 different types of artifacts associated with the local therapeutics, archival documents, drawings, plans of buildings, old photographs, postcards and books.

Szczawnica has many skiing trails and slopes. The longest (2 km) at Palenica, is fitted with a 4-person ski lift with overhead lighting and a capacity of 2,200 people per hour. It is operated by a state agency.

History
The name of the town comes from “szczawy”, which is what the locals call the acidic waters. The first historical mention of the spa town dates back to the beginning of the 16th century. Until the end of the 18th century, Szczawnica was part of the Czorsztyn district. In 1839, Józef Stefan Szalay took over the administration of Szczawnica and the development of the spa resort truly began.
The middle of the 19th century sees the town develop dynamically thanks to the vision of Józef Dietl, a doctor and promoter of spa resorts who visited Szczawnica in 1857. Seduced by the locality, he helped it to develop its hydrotherapy activities, already respecting the norms set by other European resorts. New thermal facilities are rapidly developed.

New thermal springs are discovered one after the other. Before dying, Józef Szalay ceded the management of his thermal establishment to the Academy of Learning in Kraków, which continued the visionary work of its founder despite financial difficulties. This is how the Dworek Gościnny (Guest Manor), renowned throughout Europe, was built.

In 1909, Szczawnica was acquired by Count Adam Stadnicki of Nawojowa. Despite the war that ravaged Europe a few years later, Adam Stadnicki’s activities were a success and Szczawnica profited from continuous growth. The thermal baths were renovated, the “Górny Park” extended to include the “polonyna” (the alpine grasslands above the timberline). The Inhalatorium, which was then equipped with pressurised rooms unique in Poland, was built, as was the Willa pod Modrzewiami (Villa under the Larches).

Unfortunately, the start of World War II halted the development of the spa resort and in 1948, the government of the PRL (Polish People's Republic) nationalised the resort. In 1956, the Państwowe Przedsiębiorstwo Uzdrowisko Szczawnica (National Szczawnica Spa Company) was created and focused its activities on the occupational illnesses of miners and metalworkers. The sanatoriums built at the time are named after the professions then valued by the state: Hutnik (Metalworker), Górnik (Miner), Nauczyciel (Teacher), Budowlani (Builders), Papiernik (Papermaker) and Dzwonkówka (named after a nearby mountain).

In 1973, the Natural Therapy Spa was opened, featuring all the required health equipment for baths, inhalation, physiotherapy and massages.

In 2005, the Polish government returned the Szczawnica Spa Resort to the descendants of its pre-war owners. Andrzej Mankowski, grandson of Count Adam Stadnicki, and his three children decided to invest the requisite funds and a considerable amount of work to restore Szczawnica to its old splendour and charm.

Very quickly, by 2008, the eastern part of Dietl Square was rebuilt in its historical form, containing a bar for Szczawnica’s mineral waters, an art gallery, the Café Helenka and the Holenderka and Szwajcarka villas. From 2009, the five-star Modrzewie Park hotel was ready to greet its first guests. In 2010, the Spa Resort Museum was inaugurated and more recently, in 2011, the reconstruction of the Dworek Gościnny (Guest Manor) was finished. In 2012, in collaboration with the town of Szczawnica, the last part of this long-term and passionate project – the regeneration of the Dolny
and Górny parks – was finished.

Spa resort
Szczawnica is one of the oldest spa resorts in Poland. It owes its development to Józef Szalay and Józef Dietl, the true initiator of its spa activities. He built the first thermal baths there, new buildings for baths and accommodation and promoted the town by inviting the famous people of the time there.

The Szczawnica Spa is located in the valley of the Grajcarek, the right-bank tributary of the Dunajec and between the ranges of the Pieniny and the Sącz Beskids, it forms perfect microclimate favourable for improvement of one’s health and the state of the upper respiratory tract.

There are springs of twelve acidic mineral waters - “szczawy” - whose curative properties were first mentioned in the 16th century. Until today, their curative properties attract patients from all over the world. This is why one of the main features of the Spa comes as a magnificent Pump-Room where visitors can enjoy benefits of bicarbonate, sodium, iodine, and bromide waters rich in mineral salts and numerous micro-elements.

Patients planning to arrive to the Pieniny health resort are welcome to take advantage of sanatoria and rehabilitation-and-treatment centres. They perform 42 types of treatments such as hydrotherapy, inhalations (exceptionally effective cell inhalations), physiotherapy, kinesitherapy, and drinking treatments.

The spa specializes in treatment of the upper respiratory tract disorders, including chronic nose and throat inflammations, diseases of the vocal apparatus, allergies of the upper respiratory tract, bronchial asthma; musculoskeletal disorders, i.e. degenerative disorders of the spine and joints as well as rheumatoid disorders and rheumatoid arthritis. In treatments afforded to patients, the health centres use the spa’s own balneological resources such as its own mineral waters as well as the environmental conditions, namely the therapeutic microclimate.

Mineral waters
Szczawnica’s waters are acidic mineral waters containing bicarbonate, chlorine, sodium, bromine and iodine. They are regenerative waters, with curative properties. Currently, six drinkable mineral water sources are offered in the Mineral Water Bar, rebuilt and reopened in its historical location on Dietl Square.

HELENA - spring discovered in 1844. It treats diseases of the upper and lower respiratory tract, rheumatologic disorders, chronic kidney inflammation, obesity, and osteoporosis. It is helpful in treatment of orthopedic diseases and orthopaedic trauma.

JAN - spring discovered in 1869 - bicarbonate-chloride-sodium acidic water. Used in mineral baths and in production of Szczawniczanka table water.

JÓZEF - spring discovered in 1986. It is used in treatment of the digestive system disorders, diseases of the upper and lower respiratory tracts, rheumatologic diseases, obesity and osteoporosis.

SZYMON – Recommended in gastrointestinal diseases, as well as in neuroses, obesity and gout.

PITONIAKÓWKA - Recommended in diseases of neuroses, obesity, inflammation of the upper respiratory tract and bronchi.

WANDA - Retrieved know since 1867. Recommended in diseases of the gastrointestinal tract, neuroses, obesity and gout.

MAGDALENA - spring discovered in 1939. The bi-carbonate-chloride-sodium-iodide acidic water recommended in diseases of the digestive system, inflammations of the intestine, gall bladder and bile ducts, ulcers of the stomach and duodenum, obesity and mild neuroses.

STEFAN - The spring known since 1822. The bi-carbonate-chloride-sodium-iodide acidic water. Recommended, among others, in urinary tract inflammations, nephrolithiasis, catarrhs of nose, throat, bronchi inflammations, asthma, emphysema.

JÓZEFINA - The oldest spring in Szczawnica, known already before 1810. The bicarbonate-chloride-sodium acidic water recommended in catarrhs of nose and throat, inflammations, asthma, emphysema, gout and obesity.

Twin towns
Szczawnica is twinned with:

  Spišská Belá, Slovakia
  Lesnica, Slovakia
  Oliveto Citra, Italy
  Perleberg, Germany
  Harkány, Hungary
  Khmilnyk, Ukraine

Notable people 
The ski mountaineer Szymon Zachwieja was born in Szczawnica.

Eugeniusz Kapłaniak, K1 Slalom Canoeist, 1961 Bronze and 1963 Silver Medallist at the ICF Canoe Slalom World Championships

Stefan Kapłaniak, K1 and K2 Sprint Canoeist, 1958 double Gold Medallist at the ICF Canoe Slalom World Championships, and 1960 Bronze Medallist in the Summer Olympics

Dominic Ciesielka, member of the prestigious FNN program

See also
 Pieniny National Park (Poland)
 Dunajec River Gorge
 Trzy Korony (Three Crowns) massif

Notes and references

External links
 
 English website of Szczawnica
 Uzdrowisko Szczawnica
 Thermaleo
 Jewish Community in Szczawnica on Virtual Shtetl

Cities and towns in Lesser Poland Voivodeship
Nowy Targ County
Kingdom of Galicia and Lodomeria
Kraków Voivodeship (1919–1939)
Spa towns in Poland